"Charlie Brown" is a song by British rock band Coldplay. The song was released as the third single from their fifth studio album Mylo Xyloto. The single was listed by Q magazine as their track of the day on 2 December 2011. The music video for the song was released on 2 February 2012, as well as a live version on 6 December 2011. Despite the name, the lyrics have no relation to the Peanuts franchise whatsoever.

Background
According to the band, "Charlie Brown" was the first song recorded during sessions for the band's then-upcoming fifth studio album, with the intention of being included on what later became Mylo Xyloto.
	
The lyrics of an early version of the song included a mention of the famous Peanuts character. The character's name, however, "was left out of the final recording but the name stuck as the band couldn't think of an alternative." During the writing and recording sessions of Mylo Xyloto, the song took on other names, such as "Cartoon Heart", before eventually being titled "Charlie Brown". It was written by Chris Martin in his daughter's doll's house. The doll's house was converted into a studio when Martin's daughter said she didn't like it.

Development
During an online interview with the Australian publication Sunday Herald Sun, Coldplay said they were making two records, describing "Charlie Brown" as the centre-piece of the stripped down album the band intended to make along with the electric one they were already calling Mylo Xyloto. They then decided to combine both of the albums because bassist Guy Berryman said that he "will not allow this song to be played on an accordion," as it was originally planned to be.

Coldplay first performed "Charlie Brown" at a "friends and family" gig at The Forum, Kentish Town, London on 31 May 2011. They then continued to play it at multiple shows in 2011, beginning with the Rock im Park festival in Nürnberg, Germany on 3 June 2011 and again at Rock am Ring festival the following day, which was the first live broadcast of the song officially authorised by the band and management. The song became very popular among the festivals crowd. Drummer Will Champion said it had happy memories of playing it over the summer.

Reception
"Charlie Brown" received generally positive reviews from critics. In an article published by Q magazine on 10 October 2011 entitled "First Impressions of... Coldplay's Mylo Xyloto", they wrote that "'Charlie Brown' is one of the best things Coldplay have done" and likened the song to the style of U2's The Joshua Tree and "the heady holler-alongs of Arcade Fire". They also named it as their track of the day on 2 December 2011. BBC music called Charlie Brown "one of those Coldplay-patented sun-breaking-through-clouds moments" and gave praise to Buckland's guitar riff. Billboard called the song one of the "album's best track(s). Chorus riff will haunt every corner of your mind. Oriental flair recalls "Viva La Vida" album."

Under The Radar praised the song and said "Mylo Xylotos finest anthem, 'Charlie Brown,' shoots for The Suburbs with the clumsy line 'Stole the key/took a car downtown to where the lost boys meet/took what they offered me' but redeems itself with a massive, ascending guitar hook that I can't help feeling would have sound-tracked any climactic scene from Friday Night Lights beautifully." PopMatters said that the song "absolutely crackled with energy" and felt "it shows the band having stumbled upon one of those great, instantly recognisable melodies that sounds better with each reiteration—who would’ve thought a guitar and a xylophone could sound so epic when paired together." Will Hermes of Rolling Stone had mixed feelings for the song, and gave the song two and a half stars out of five in his preview of numerous songs from Mylo Xyloto, saying that the song "triangulates Springsteen, U2 and Arcade Fire in a hood-rat oratorio that roars even if Chris Martin's delivery feels too gentle."

"Charlie Brown" was chosen as ESPN's title song for the commercials and introduction videos of its coverage of Euro 2012. Coldplay performed the song at the 2012 BRIT Awards' opening segment and it subsequently climbed up to number 30 in the UK Singles Chart. The track was later nominated for Grammy Award for Best Rock Performance at the 2013 Grammy Awards. In 2012, 3voor12 included "Charlie Brown" at number 26 in their "Songs of the Year" list, while La Repubblica ranked it among the best songs of decade.

Music videos
On 6 December 2011 Coldplay uploaded a promotional, music video for "Charlie Brown" to their official YouTube account, which utilised footage from a collection of concerts they had performed throughout the band's 2011 Summer Festival Tour. The video was directed by Mat Whitecross and Mark Rowbotham. In the description section of the music video, the band's drummer Will Champion announced that a "proper" video would be released at a later stage.

The official music video for "Charlie Brown", to which Champion was referring was filmed with director Mat Whitecross throughout November and December 2011. Additional filming was made in mid to late January 2012. The "Xylobands" conceptual creator for the Mylo Xyloto Tour posted on Twitter that there would be photos from the video uploaded on 2 February 2012 and that the official music video would be posted on VEVO the following morning on 3 February 2012.

The video was released on VEVO, YouTube, Facebook, Twitter, Google+ and their own website at 03.00 am on 3 February 2012. On YouTube, the video received over 700,000 views within the first 24 hours of its release. The video was also met with acclaim from critics, who praised its visuals, themes and fast-paced editing.
The video features Shameless star Elliott Tittensor and Misfits star Antonia Thomas.

Track listing

Credits and personnel
Recording
Recorded at The Bakery and The Beehive, London, UK and Electric Lady Studios, New York.

Mastering
Mastered at Gateway Studios, United States.

Personnel

Guy Berryman – composer, bass, backing vocals
Jonny Buckland – composer, lead guitar, backing vocals
Will Champion – composer, drums, backing vocals
Chris Martin – composer, acoustic guitar, piano, lead vocals
Markus Dravs – producer, programmer
Daniel Green – producer
Rik Simpson – producer
Brian Eno – "enoxification" and additional composition, backing vocals
Mark "Spike" Stent – mixer
Matt McGinn – dulcimer
Davide Rossi – strings
Credits adapted from promotional single liner notes.

Matt Green – assistant mixer
Pierre Eiras – assistant mixer
Dave Emery – assistant mixer
Olga Fitzroy – assistant mixer
Robin Baynton – editor, programmer	
Andy Rugg – studio assistant
Christian Green – studio assistant
Noah Goldstein – studio assistant
Ian Shea – studio assistant
Luis Jardim – percussion
Bob Ludwig – mastering engineer

Charts

Weekly charts

Year-end charts

Certifications

Release history

References

2011 songs
2011 singles
Coldplay songs
Songs about depression
Songs about drugs
Songs about luck
Songs written by Chris Martin
Songs written by Jonny Buckland
Songs written by Guy Berryman
Songs written by Will Champion
Song recordings produced by Markus Dravs
Song recordings produced by Rik Simpson
Music videos directed by Mat Whitecross